The 31st edition of the Deutschland Tour cycle race took place in Germany from August 10 to August 18, 2007. It did not start with the traditional prologue but with a normal stage. The race began in Saarbrücken and finished in Hanover. For the second year in a row Jens Voigt held off Levi Leipheimer to take the victory.

Final General Classification

Teams
23 teams took part.  Of the 20 ProTour teams, only  did not take part (the team was in crisis from doping results at the 2007 Tour de France). Four non-ProTour teams were given a wildcard invitation: Skil–Shimano, Team Volksbank, Team Wiesenhof–Felt and Elk Haus-Simplon.

Stages

Stage 1 Saarbrücken 183.7 km Friday, August 10

Stage 2 Bretten Team Time Trial 42.2 km Saturday, August 11

Stage 3 Pforzheim – Offenburg 181.8 km Sunday, August 12

Stage 4 Singen – Sonthofen 183.8 km Monday, August 13

Stage 5 Singen – Sölden (Austria) 157.6 km Tuesday, August 14

Stage 6 Längenfeld (Austria) – Kufstein (Austria) 175 km Wednesday, August 15

Stage 7 Kufstein (Austria) – Regensburg 192.2 km Thursday, August 16

Stage 8 Fürth Individual Time Trial 33.1 km Friday, August 17

Stage 9 Einbeck – Hannover 143.1 km Saturday, August 18 

Stage 9 result

Jersey progress

External links
Race website

2007
2007 in German sport
2007 UCI ProTour